David N. Johnson (born June 28, 1922, San Antonio, Texas; died August 2, 1987 in Tempe, Arizona) was an American organist, composer, educator, choral clinician, and lecturer.

He studied organ and composition at Curtis Institute of Music (1940–1942). Between 1942 and 1946 he served in the U.S. Army Signal Corps/Air Corps in India, Burma, and China, receiving a Meritorious Service Award and campaign ribbons. He continued his music studies at Trinity University (Texas) (BMus 1950) and Syracuse University (MMus 1951, PhD 1956). He also held the associate certificate from the American Guild of Organists (AAGO).

He was a lecturer at Syracuse University (1951). From 1960–1967, he was college organist and organ instructor at St Olaf College, Northfield MN. He was named music department chair at St Olaf in 1965. In 1967, he succeeded Arthur Poister as professor of music and university organist at Syracuse University. He moved to Arizona in 1969, where he taught at Arizona State University, Tempe. He died in Tempe on August 2, 1987. He was married to Margaret S. Teal, and was the father of six children.

Johnson published well over 300 compositions, most of them for church use, and was author of an Instruction Book for Beginning Organists (1964) and an Organ Teacher's Guide (1971).
 
Johnson's Trumpet Tune in D (1962) is the opening and closing theme for the weekly radio show With Heart and Voice, with host Peter DuBois. Johnson's Trumpet Tune in D was also the first of two processionals used for the 1971 wedding of Richard Nixon's Daughter, Tricia, who was married in the White House Rose Garden with music provided by a string orchestra. Since this work was originally composed for organ, it was transcribed for string orchestra for its performance at the wedding.

Several of Johnson's Trumpet Tunes have been recorded by Christopher Herrick in his Organ Fireworks series on the Hyperion record label.

Johnson's best-known vocal/choral work is "The Lone, Wild Bird." Inspired, in part, by his seeing a solitary white bird while en route by ship (in the early 1940s) from Los Angeles to Bombay, India – hundreds of miles from the nearest land in the middle of the South Pacific. Haunted by the image of that bird, Johnson later paired an American folk tune, "Prospect" from "The Sacred Harp" (1844), with a 1925 poem by the Rev. Richard McFayden (also McFadyen), entitled "The Lone, Wild Fowl" – also taking some poetic license with the title.  It first appeared in "Twelve Folksongs and Spirituals" (1968), compiled and arranged by Johnson. The pairing is so natural that many assume it is the tune's original text, and vice versa.

References 

Connection to Augsburg Fortress bio of D N Johnson
See article on the hymn, "Earth and All Stars" which credits David N. Johnson as the composer of the melody:
https://www.reformedworship.org/article/june-1990/hymn-month

1922 births
1987 deaths
American classical organists
American male organists
Texas classical music
American male classical composers
American classical composers
Composers for pipe organ
Classical composers of church music
Curtis Institute of Music alumni
Trinity University (Texas) alumni
20th-century classical composers
20th-century American composers
20th-century organists
20th-century American male musicians
United States Army personnel of World War II
Male classical organists